Tritonoharpa lanceolata is a species of sea snail, a marine gastropod mollusk in the family Cancellariidae, the nutmeg snails.

Description
These mollusks inhabit a conical spiral shell no more than 38 mm in length.

Distribution
Tritonoharpa lanceolata can be found along the coast-line of the south-eastern United States from North Carolina to Florida. It is also found along the shores of the Gulf of Mexico and the islands of the Caribbean Sea. They are found mostly in shallow waters near the coast usually between 1 m and 18 m in depth.

References

 Hemmen J. (2007). Recent Cancellariidae. Wiesbaden, 428pp

External links
  Database of Western Atlantic Marine Mollusca

Cancellariidae
Gastropods described in 1828